The Delmas Treason Trial (1985–1988) in South Africa was the prosecution of 22 anti-apartheid activists under security laws, with the intention of suppressing the United Democratic Front (UDF). The defendants included three senior UDF leaders, Moses Chikane, Mosiuoa Lekota and Popo Molefe, known as the "Big Three". Eleven of the accused were found guilty in the same courtroom where Nelson Mandela was found guilty. Their sentences were overturned in 1989 after an appeal to the Supreme Court. The trial was the longest in South African history at the time.

Judge 
Justice Kees van Dijkhorst

Defendants 

 Thomas Madikwe Manthata
 Popo Simon Molefe
 Mosiuoa Gerard Patrick Lekota
 Moses Mabokela Chikane
 Simon Tseko Nkoli

Prosecution side 
Prosecutors in the trail argued that the United Democratic Front was a cover-up for an internal wing of the African National Congress. The African National Congress had been outlawed by the government for over two decades during the trial. Therefore, by the prosecution linking the two groups together, the state could use that for grounds to criminalize any violent or non-violent protest activity initiated by the UDF. The trial mainly focused on the UDF's role in protesting and boycotting the Indian elections during South Africa's 1984 General Election.

Defence side 
The defence rejected the fact that its clients had any plans or participated in overthrowing the state. It argued that the United Democratic Front was a non-violent organization. It brought up documents and meeting notes showing that the African National Congress had long-standing grievances with the United Democratic Front on issues surrounding the Black diaspora. Additionally, the United Democratic Front provided witnesses that argued that the organization fought for a more united, non-racial South Africa; however, they did this through ensuring more political rights for Blacks rather than plotting to overthrow the government.

Verdict 
In his ruling, the judge found that the dominant leadership of the United Democratic Front, Moses Chikane, Mosiuoa Lekota, and Popo Molefe were responsible for forming a revolutionary climate against the state. He stated that the group had popularized views made by the African National Congress and fueled hatred against the government. The judge ruled that no group, especially the UDF, could commit high treason without violence. Ultimately, the verdict showed how South African government was still unwilling to accept opposition to apartheid policies. The men were sentenced to 10 years in prison. However, on December 15, 1989, after being in jail for over four years, the United Democratic Front members won an appeal based on a technicality and were released from jail.

References

1985 in South African law
1986 in South African law
1987 in South African law
1988 in South African law
Treason in South Africa
Trials in South Africa
Treason trials